The History of Travel (printed between 1555 – 1599) is a collection of travel writings published and printed by Richard Jugge (1514 – 1577). The work records exploration narratives by sailors and explorers during the Age of Exploration.

Contents
The work contains European exploration fiction (mostly Spanish and Italian accounts) which details narratives of seafarers and merchants who travelled between the 14th and 16th centuries, including Sebastian Münster, translated into English, editions of Oviedos'  (Of the natural history of the Indies), Antonio Pigafetta's  (First trip around the terraqueous globe), Peter of Anglerias' Decades 1-3 of De orbe novo decades (Decades of the New World), and Giacomo Gastaldi's Debate and  appear detailing some of the dominant traffick routes of the European powers. The territories visited included the West and East Indies, Moscovia, the Middle East, Egypt, Ethiopia, Guinea, China and Japan.

The text was still in circulation by the early 17th century and was printed in London by Richard Jugge in 1577. The text was a follow up edition of Richard Eden's travel work Decades of the Newe Worlde. The text was later put into Elizabethan compendiums by Richard Hakluyt in his Principall Navigations, Voiages, Traffiques and Discoueries of the English Nation (1589 and 1599).  Some editions contain woodcut diagrams and historiated initial and floriated detailing.

Giapan

Richard Wylles (an English Catholic writer, b.1546 - 1577) another editor was active between 1558-1577 and co-edited the 1577 edition with Eden, penning a section entitled Of the Ilande Giapan, and other  in the Eaſt Ocean through pages 251 - 260, thought to be one of the earliest accounts on Japan in English. The account describes how Willes ascertained 'two hitherto unknown documents that contained descriptions of both China and Japan [with a] ... report on China [that] had come into his hands by way of a Portuguese merchant who had been captured and imprisoned by ...  the Ming imperial court.' Wylles had 'acquired a handful of private letters about "the Japonish nation", written by the Jesuit monk, Padre Luis Frois. These letters had been written to fellow Jesuits and were not intended to be studied – still less published – by 'hereticke' Protestants.' The Jesuits  had begun missionary work in 1550 under Francis Xavier in Japan and thus the name had become Latinized to 'Giapan' or more commonly as 'Iapon'.

The documents caused interest into trade with Japan, as there were large reported silver deposits mentioned by travellers like Marco Polo and with 'so much snow that the houses being buried in it, the inhabitants keep within ' there was thought to be an excellent wool market in Japan.
The text also notes the dangers of doing business, of the great piracie attacking Ming merchants.

The text also describes the Japanese themselves being '‘tractable, civill, courteous [and] without deceit', their diet and  noting the practice of honourable suicide carried out by a samurai 'lancing his body , from the breast  all the belly, ’. The Ainu of Hokkaido were noted by the monks as ‘savage men, clothed in beasts , rough-bodied, with huge beards and monstrous muchaches'.

This account would later inspire a failed voyage to Japan via the Kara Sea chartered by Hakulyt by English merchants in 1580 in the George and William, with only the George returning by December 25 and the William destroyed by ice flows traveling along the Northwest passage.

Contemporary European Maps of Japan from 1535 - 1599

External links
1577 edition
1599 edition

References

16th-century books
British travel writers